Crimson Bound is a fantasy novel inspired by Little Red Riding Hood and written by Rosamund Hodge. The book is set in a fae-dwelling land with Grimm-style magic and French names and inspired locations. "Crimson Bound" retells Little Red Riding Hood with a dark, magical twist.

Plot

References

2015 American novels
Works based on Little Red Riding Hood
2015 fantasy novels
Balzer + Bray books